The 1844 United States presidential election in Connecticut took place between November 1 and December 4, 1844, as part of the 1844 United States presidential election. Voters chose six representatives, or electors to the Electoral College, who voted for President and Vice President.

Connecticut voted for the Whig candidate, Henry Clay, over Democratic candidate James K. Polk. Clay won Connecticut by a narrow margin of 4.63%.

As of 2020, this is the most recent presidential election in which the town of Woodbury voted for the Democratic nominee.

Results

See also
 United States presidential elections in Connecticut

References

Connecticut
1844
1844 Connecticut elections